Samuel Wanderlei da Silva (born 27 October 2000) is a Brazilian footballer who currently plays as a forward for Japanese side Oita Trinita.

Career statistics

Club

Notes

References

2000 births
Living people
People from Duque de Caxias, Rio de Janeiro
Sportspeople from Rio de Janeiro (state)
Brazilian footballers
Association football forwards
Campeonato Brasileiro Série B players
Esporte Clube Vitória players
Oita Trinita players
Brazilian expatriate footballers
Brazilian expatriate sportspeople in Japan
Expatriate footballers in Japan